The 2020 Kansas State Wildcats football team represented Kansas State University in the 2020 NCAA Division I FBS football season. The Wildcats played their home games at Bill Snyder Family Football Stadium in Manhattan, Kansas, and competed in the Big 12 Conference. They were led by second-year head coach Chris Klieman.

After completing their regular season with a record of 4–6 (4–5 in conference play), the program announced on December 16 that it would not pursue a bid to a bowl game, "because of mounting COVID-19 issues on its roster."

Previous season
The Wildcats finished the 2019 season with an 8–5 record, 5–4 Big 12 play, losing the Liberty Bowl to Navy.

Preseason

Big 12 media Days
The Big 12 media days were held on July 21–22, 2020 in a virtual format due to the COVID-19 pandemic.

Big 12 media poll

Schedule

Regular season
Kansas State released its 2020 schedule on October 22, 2019.

The Wildcats had games scheduled against Buffalo and North Dakota as out of conference opponents, but these games were canceled due to the COVID-19 pandemic. In fact, the whole season schedule was changed and the finalized one is shown below. The original schedule is shown under Game Summaries. 

Schedule Source:

Coaching staff

Game summaries

vs. Arkansas State

Both teams entered the game with a reduced roster due to the effects of the coronavirus pandemic.  Arkansas State was down nearly 10 starters and K-State was without approximately two dozen players—however, both teams had enough active personnel to play the game. After the game, Arkansas State announced that it will not play its home opener game Central Arkansas the Red Wolves were unable to assemble a complete depth chart for the game.

at Oklahoma

vs. Texas Tech

at TCU

vs. Kansas (Homecoming)

Phillip Brooks, sophomore wide receiver, had two punt returns in the first half.

at West Virginia

vs. Oklahoma State

at Iowa State

at Baylor

vs. Texas

Rankings

References

Kansas State
Kansas State Wildcats football seasons
Kansas State Wildcats football